DWP may refer to:

 Department for Work and Pensions, government department of the UK government
 Design Worldwide Partnership, an architectural and design firm
 Duluth, Winnipeg and Pacific Railway (reporting mark)
 Democratic Workers Party, a former US communist party
 Djakarta Warehouse Project, annual music festival held in Jakarta, Indonesia
 Los Angeles Department of Water and Power, a large municipal utility in the US
 Diving With a Purpose, a non-profit active in maritime archaeology